Admiral Sir Benjamin John Key,  (born 7 November 1965) is a senior Royal Navy officer. He has served as First Sea Lord since November 2021. He was appointed Fleet Commander in 2016, and the Chief of Joint Operations in 2019.

Early life and education
Key was born on 7 November 1965. He was educated at Bromsgrove School, a private school in Bromsgrove, Worcestershire. He studied physics at Royal Holloway, University of London.

Naval career
Key joined the Royal Navy in 1984. After serving as an observer in the Fleet Air Arm, he saw action as a Principal Warfare Officer in the frigate  during the Kosovo War in 1999. He went on to be a staff officer in the Directorate of Naval Resources and Plans at the Ministry of Defence in 2003, Advisor to the Director Joint Staff in the Iraqi Joint Headquarters in 2006 and then a staff officer at the Permanent Joint Headquarters in Northwood in 2007. After that he became commanding officer of the aircraft carrier  in February 2009, Commodore Joint Air Maritime Organisation in February 2010 and Director of Naval Plans and Resources at the Ministry of Defence in May 2011.

Key was appointed Principal Staff Officer to the Chief of the Defence Staff in November 2011, and Flag Officer Sea Training in April 2013. He was appointed Fleet Commander and promoted to the rank of vice admiral on 10 February 2016. He became Chief of Joint Operations in April 2019.

Key received the United States Bronze Star Medal in 2006 and was appointed Commander of the Order of the British Empire (CBE) in the 2016 New Year Honours, and Knight Commander of the Order of the Bath (KCB) in the 2021 New Year Honours. He was awarded the Honorary degree of Doctor of Science (D.Sc) by Royal Holloway, University of London on 20 December 2018.

Key led Operation Pitting, the UK's evacuation efforts in Afghanistan following the 2021 Taliban offensive, in August 2021 and, on 15 October, it was announced that Key was to be the next First Sea Lord. He assumed the post from Admiral Sir Tony Radakin on 8 November 2021.

References

|-

|-

|-

1965 births
Living people
Royal Navy admirals
First Sea Lords and Chiefs of the Naval Staff
People educated at Bromsgrove School
Alumni of Royal Holloway, University of London
Foreign recipients of United States military awards and decorations
Commanders of the Order of the British Empire
Knights Commander of the Order of the Bath
Military personnel of the Kosovo War
Royal Navy personnel of the Iraq War
Military personnel from Warwickshire